St Monans, sometimes spelt St Monance, is a village and parish in the East Neuk of Fife and is named after the legendary Saint Monan.

The former burgh rests on a hill overlooking the Firth of Forth, with views to North Berwick, the Bass Rock and the Isle of May. St Monans contains many historical buildings, including the now defunct windmill (which can be visited) that once powered a salt panning industry, and a 14th-century church that sits on the rocks above the water on the western side.

In 2002, with the permission of Historic Scotland, an unsuccessful attempt to restore the castle was made.

The civil parish had a population of 1,357 in 2011.

Harbour

As with many of the East Neuk villages the harbour began as a simple natural inlet protected by natural rock outcrops. The first structures were the slipways for launching small boats. The first mention of a manmade harbour is in 1649 (west of the existing harbour). The east pier dates from 1865 and was designed by David Stevenson and Thomas Stevenson. The west pier was created in 1902 by their nephew Charles Alexander Stevenson who also deepened the harbour to take larger vessels. Plans for various stages in the Stevenson's development of the harbour are available on the National Library of Scotland website.

Parish church
St Monans Church dates from 1369 and is situated in an isolated position to the west of the village on the very edge of the sea. It is perched on a low rock, over a small valley with a burn. As seen from most directions it has the sea as a backdrop. The original graveyard surrounds the church and a more modern cemetery stands further westwards on the upper slopes of the little hill. This contains the local war memorial. Standing at the extreme west end of this the ruin of an earlier church can be viewed across fields, again perched on the sea edge.

It is often said that, in the whole of Scotland, St Monans Church is the church nearest the sea, and this may well be the case, being only around 20 m from the edge. The church, one of the finest remaining from the Middle Ages in Scotland, was built by King David II Bruce (1329–71), initially for a small house of Dominican friars. It later became the Church of Scotland parish church. Though the church may never have been finished (it has a choir and transepts, with a short spire over the crossing, but lacks a nave), it has many features of architectural interest, notably the fine stone vaulting in the choir and the plain but handsome sedilia. White-washed throughout internally, the church is particularly light and attractive among ancient Scottish churches.

The church was greatly restored in 1899 by the Glasgow architect, Peter MacGregor Chalmers.

The church hall was added in 1913 to a design by Sir Robert Lorimer.

Major restoration to the windows and masonry was completed in March 2007. The church is open to visitors daily from April to October.

The church and churchyard feature in a number of films including the remake of Whisky Galore! (2016 film) and the funeral, wedding and pier scenes in the film The Railway Man. It was also used in the 1981 Johnny Cash Christmas Special.

St. Monans Gospel Hall
The Hall was built in 1970 and is a modern building, harled with a slate roof, situated in a raised location facing broadly west over Hope Park on the northern edge of St. Monans. Prior to its construction, it was not uncommon for fishermen from St Monans to cycle to St Andrews to attend meetings at the Gospel Hall there.

Shops, hotels, cafés and businesses
St Monans has a fish merchants and a fish-smokehouse. Restaurants and cafes are common in the village, as are many privately owned holiday homes. There is also a caravan park which attracts many visitors, a tradition that has continued from the days of the railway line.

In the industrial estate at the entrance to St Monans are the remains of the old railway station, a relic of the old East Neuk Rail Line, part of the Fife Coast Railway which was shut down in the 1960s after the Beeching cuts. All that remains is the south platform which is overgrown with grass. Nearby is the station master's house, now a private residence, which stands out from the newer buildings surrounding it.

The Battle of St Monans
Author Leonard Low claims to have found documents indicating that a significant battle occurred a short distance from the church grounds in 1548. Low claims that the Scottish army, pulling away from losses in Musselburgh and Edinburgh turned to fight, and defeat, the invading English army at St Monans.

Written records of this battle appear to have been lost when Oliver Cromwell ordered all Scottish records be shipped to the Tower of London, and several barrels filled with documents were lost at sea en route. The only surviving record of the battle was recovered in an account written for Mary Queen of Scots.

History
The village takes its name from St Monan, who was killed by invading Danes in about 875. St Adrian was killed on the Isle of May in the same raid, and 6,000 Fife Christians are said to have died.

Like other small East Neuk towns, St Monans is rich in vernacular fisher and merchant houses of the 17th to early 19th centuries, with characteristic old Scots features, e.g. forestairs, crow-stepped gables, datestones, pantiled roofs etc. The tradition of shipbuilding has now ceased. For over 200 years the boat builder J W Miller & Sons Ltd produced fifie fishing boats, yachts and motor launches in the village.

The author Christopher Rush grew up in the village. His autobiography Hellfire and Herring describes the community as seen by a small boy in the 1940s, 1950s and earlier, and as recounted by his grandfather and other relatives.

Notable residents
Charlie Cooke, professional footballer

References

Footnotes

External links

 St Monans
 East Neuk of Fife, Scotland - information resource
 St Monans
 St Monans Windmill

 
Villages in Fife
Parishes in Fife